McTyeire College was a Methodist college in McKenzie, Tennessee founded in 1858 and chartered in 1860.

History
The college originally opened in the community of Caledonia in Henry County, Tennessee as Caledonia College. Caledonia closed when students left to fight in the American Civil War, and the school building burned down during the war. The college reopened in McKenzie, Tennessee and was rechartered in 1871 as McKenzie College. The school was renamed McTyeire Institute in 1882 under the direction of the Methodist Church. The school closed in 1931.

References

Defunct private universities and colleges in Tennessee
Methodist universities and colleges in the United States
Educational institutions established in 1860
1860 establishments in Tennessee
Educational institutions disestablished in 1931
1931 disestablishments in the United States